Dyella  is a genus of bacteria from the family of Rhodanobacteraceae. Dyella is named after the New Zealand microbiologist Douglas W. Dye.

References

Further reading 
 
 <
 
 
 

Xanthomonadales
Bacteria genera